North Royalton High School is a public high school located in North Royalton, Ohio, United States, a suburban community in Greater Cleveland. Over 1,000 students attend the school. The school is best known for its marching band, led by Band Director David Vitale.  The school also has a football team that entertains marching band fans on Friday nights. North Royalton is a member of the National Division of the Suburban League. The school colors are purple and gold and athletic teams are known as the Bears.

State championships

 Baseball State Runner-ups - 2014 (2nd team in school history to make it to a state championship)
 Boys Soccer - 1983 State Runner up
 Boys Soccer – 1979 

The 1979 North Royalton Bears state champion soccer team is the 1st boys’ soccer team in the history of Ohio to finish the season undefeated at 21-0-0.

Band
The North Royalton High School Band Program is the largest student organization on campus with over 190 members.  The band program incorporates a competitive corps-style marching band, as well four concert bands: Freshman Band, Concert Band, Symphonic Band, and Wind Ensemble. It also has two jazz bands. The marching band has received a "Superior" rating at the Ohio Music Education Association (OMEA) state finals 32 consecutive times since 1989. They have performed at Walt Disney World, Disneyland, The Tournament of Roses Parade in Pasadena, California, The Indianapolis 500 Parade, the BCS Championship in New Orleans, and many more destinations around the country.  David Vitale is the director of bands, and is an active composer and arranger.  His latest show was entitled "Carpe Diem!"

Vocal music
The North Royalton High School vocal music department has had at least one choir since its founding. The oldest performing group is the Concert Choir made up of SATB singers from different grade-levels. In the 1980s, North Royalton expanded to include "Royal Harmony", a competing SATB show choir. In addition to choirs, the vocal music department helps to produce an annual musical each spring. There are currently five choirs:  Freshman Choir, Concert Choir, Royaltones (co-ed a cappella), Royal Harmony (co-ed competitive show choir), and the Bearitones (male a cappella).

The Dan Calabrese Center for the Performing Arts
North Royalton High School's performing arts center, The Dan Calabrese Center for the Performing Arts (known as "The PAC"), was built in the mid-1980s and has hosted a number of shows and events since. It has played host to the musicals such as Guys and Dolls, Annie, The Pajama Game, Big Fish, The Music Man, Grease, How to Succeed in Business..., Footloose,  Little Shop of Horrors, and West Side Story.

The PAC has also been the home of many events such as the Royalton Rock-Off, which was a benefit concert showcasing a number of student-formed rock bands. Additionally, the annual talent featured such acts as The Villagers, a singing group founded in 1996 that featured a revolving cast of new performers in successive years through 2010.

Notable alumni
Dan France- Professional football player in the National Football League (NFL)
Nicole Marie Lenz- Actress, Playboy model
Omari Spellman - Professional basketball player in the National Basketball Association (NBA); attended NRHS for 9th and 10th grade
George White - Professional football player in the Canadian Football League (CFL)
Greg Schultz - the campaign manager for Joe Biden's 2020 presidential campaign in the United States.
Tay Zonday - viral YouTube sensation behind the song Chocolate Rain

References

External links

High schools in Cuyahoga County, Ohio
Public high schools in Ohio